Essam Ismail (born 5 August 1967) is an athlete and professor from Egypt. He competes in archery. 

Essam competed at the 2000 and 2004 Summer Olympics in men's individual archery. He was defeated in the first round of elimination on both occasions, placing 56th overall in 2000 and 62nd in 2004.

References

1967 births
Living people
Olympic archers of Egypt
Archers at the 2000 Summer Olympics
Archers at the 2004 Summer Olympics
Egyptian male archers
20th-century Egyptian people
21st-century Egyptian people